Uspenka is a rural locality (a selo) and the administrative center of Uspensky Selsoviet of Akhtubinsky District, Astrakhan Oblast, Russia. The population was 987 as of 2010. There are 28 streets.

Geography 
Uspenka is located 16 km southeast of Akhtubinsk (the district's administrative centre) by road. Akhtubinsk is the nearest rural locality.

References 

Rural localities in Akhtubinsky District